Konstantin Okulov (born 18 February 1995) is a Russian professional ice hockey Forward who is currently playing for HC CSKA Moscow in the Kontinental Hockey League (KHL).

Career statistics

International

Awards and honors

References

External links

1995 births
Living people
HC CSKA Moscow players
HC Sibir Novosibirsk players
Sportspeople from Novosibirsk